Elias Constantino Pereira Filho (born 13 February 1987 in Campos dos Goytacazes, Rio de Janeiro), simply known as Elias, is a Brazilian footballer who plays for Madureira as a forward.

Honours 
Madureira
Copa Rio: 2011

CRB
Campeonato Alagoano: 2017

References

External links
Elias at playmakerstats.com (English version of ogol.com.br)

1987 births
Living people
People from Campos dos Goytacazes
Brazilian footballers
Association football forwards
Campeonato Brasileiro Série A players
Campeonato Brasileiro Série B players
Campeonato Brasileiro Série C players
Chinese Super League players
Esporte Clube São João da Barra players
Resende Futebol Clube players
Duque de Caxias Futebol Clube players
Madureira Esporte Clube players
Esporte Clube Bahia players
Botafogo de Futebol e Regatas players
Nova Iguaçu Futebol Clube players
Figueirense FC players
Sampaio Corrêa Futebol Clube players
Clube de Regatas Brasil players
Jiangsu F.C. players
Cuiabá Esporte Clube players
Esporte Clube São Bento players
Esporte Clube Juventude players
Villa Nova Atlético Clube players
América Futebol Clube (MG) players
Esporte Clube Jacuipense players
Brazilian expatriate footballers
Brazilian expatriate sportspeople in China
Expatriate footballers in China
Sportspeople from Rio de Janeiro (state)